Lopez Early College High School serves as the magnet school of the fine arts as well as the agricultural academy at Brownsville Independent School District in Texas. In 2015, the school was rated "Met Standard" by the Texas Education Agency.

Athletics
The Lopez Lobos compete in the following sports:

Baseball
Basketball
Cross Country
Football
Golf
Powerlifting
Soccer
Softball
Swimming and Diving
Tennis
Track and Field
Volleyball

State Titles
Boys Soccer 
2004(4A)
Girls Diving

State Finalists
Boys Soccer  
2009(5A)
2014 Boys and Girls District Champs

References

External links
 

Education in Brownsville, Texas
Educational institutions established in 1996
Brownsville Independent School District high schools
Magnet schools in Texas
1996 establishments in Texas